In demonology, Raum is a Great Earl of Hell, ruling thirty legions of demons. He is depicted as a crow which adopts human form at the request of the conjurer.

Characteristics
Raum steals treasures out of kings' houses, carrying them where he wishes, and destroys cities and dignities of men (he is said to have great dispraise for dignities). Raum can also tell things past, present and future, reconcile friends and foes, and invoke love.

Etymology
'Raum' in German means "space, room, chamber"; 'räumen' means to empty, evacuate.  See lebensraum, literally "living room" (that is, room for living - like an aquarium for fish, not a living room).

Other spellings include Raim, Raym, and Räum.

See also

 The Lesser Key of Solomon, a 17th-century text which references Raum.
 Gustav Davidson

Citations

References

Goetic demons
Legendary crows